Werner Carobbio (born 10 November 1936) is a Swiss socialist politician from Mendrisio.

Biography
Prior to 1969, Carobbio was a member of the Social Democratic Party (PS), but was expelled from the party due to ideological differences. As a result, he founded the marxist-oriented Autonomous Socialist Party (PSA) alongside Pietro Martinelli. In 1975, Carobbio was elected to the National Council for the PSA. In 1991, the PSA merged back into the PS, and Carobbio maintained his seat in the National Council, now representing PS, until his retirement in 1999.

References

Social Democratic Party of Switzerland politicians
Swiss communists
People from Mendrisio

1936 births
Living people